Heinrich von Lichtenau (1444–1517) was Prince-Bishop of Augsburg from 1505 to 1517.

Biography

Heinrich von Lichtenau was born in Mindelheim in 1444.  He was ordained as a priest in Augsburg in 1484.

The cathedral chapter of Augsburg Cathedral elected him Prince-Bishop of Augsburg on 1 April 1505.  Pope Julius II confirmed his appointment on 7 May 1505, and he was consecrated as a bishop by Gabriel von Eyb, Bishop of Eichstätt, on 27 July 1505.

He died on 12 April 1517.

References

1444 births
1517 deaths
Roman Catholic bishops of Augsburg
Prince-bishops in the Holy Roman Empire